Joyce Esther Smith  (née Byatt, born 26 October 1937) is a British former long-distance runner. She broke the world record in the 3000 metres in 1971 and is a three-time medallist at the International/World Cross Country Championships, including winning in 1972. She went on to twice win the London Marathon, becoming the first British woman in history to run under 2:30 when winning in 1981 with 2:29:57, before further improving the British record to 2:29:43 when winning in 1982. She also competed in the 1500 metres at the 1972 Munich Olympics and finished 11th in the marathon at the 1984 Los Angeles Olympics, aged 46.

Biography
Smith was born in Stoke Newington, London, and began running competitively in the 1950s, at which time the longest distance for women in international competitions was 800 metres. She won the English National Crosscountry Championship (AAA) in 1959 and 1960. In 1965, she told Athletics Weekly that she intended to continue competing "for two more years at the most" and stopped running competitively in 1968.

Smith returned to competitive running in 1969, and broke the world record for the 3000 metres distance in 1971, and won the bronze medal in 1971, the gold medal in 1972 and the silver medal in 1973 in the IAAF World Cross Country Championships. She reached the semi-final of the 1500 metres at the 1972 Olympic Games. In 1973, she won her third National Crosscountry Championship. She won the bronze medal in 3000 m at the European Athletics Championships in 1974.

In 1978, she retired from track running after setting a new world record for 3000 m in the age group W40 of 9:11.2 minutes, which was broken 27 years later, and ran her first marathon in 1979, beating the previous British record held by Rosemary Cox by nine minutes and seventeen seconds in a time of 2:41:37.

In 1979, she won the Avon International Marathon in Waldniel. In 1979 and 1980, she won the first two editions of the Tokyo International Women's Marathon. In 1980, she set a new British 25 kilometre record of 1:28:18 in Bruges, which was also the new W40 world record which was broken 24 years later.

In 1981, she won the first London Marathon in 2:29:57, becoming the first British woman and the first woman over 40 to complete the distance in less than two and a half hours. A year later, she won the event in 2:29:43, again setting a new British record, and becoming the oldest woman to win the race at 44 years, 195 days, a record which has not yet been broken.

In the first World Athletics Championships in 1983 in Helsinki, she finished ninth in the marathon. In 1984, she became the oldest female Olympic athlete by running in the first women's Olympic marathon, and finished eleventh at the age of 46.

She retired from competitive running in 1986 after setting a new W45 record for the ten-mile distance of 55:33.

In the 1984 New Year Honours, Smith was appointed a Member of the Order of the British Empire (MBE) for services to athletics. She and her husband, Bryan, are on the board of trustees of the London Marathon Charitable Trust. Bryan is a marathon coach who also organises the Mini London Marathon.

Achievements

References

External links
 
 London Marathon: First lady is still the one and only, Article by Simon Turnbull in The Independent, 14. April 2002

1937 births
Living people
People from Stoke Newington
Athletes from London
English female marathon runners
English female long-distance runners
English female middle-distance runners
Olympic athletes of Great Britain
Athletes (track and field) at the 1972 Summer Olympics
Athletes (track and field) at the 1984 Summer Olympics
World record setters in athletics (track and field)
Members of the Order of the British Empire
London Marathon female winners
British masters athletes
World record holders in masters athletics
European Athletics Championships medalists
World Athletics Championships athletes for Great Britain
International Cross Country Championships winners